Øyulf Hjertenes (born 23 May 1979) is a Norwegian economist, journalist and newspaper editor.

Career
Hjertenes was born in Florø. He is educated cand.oecon. from the Norwegian School of Economics. He has worked as journalist for the newspapers Dagbladet, Bergensavisen and Firdaposten. He was chief editor of the newspaper Bergens Tidende from 2015 to 2019. In 2019 he was assigned another administrative position in the Schibsted media group, and Frøy Gudbrandsen took over as chief editor of Bergens Tidende.

References

1979 births
Living people
People from Flora, Norway
Norwegian School of Economics alumni
Norwegian newspaper editors
Norwegian economists
Bergens Tidende editors